Now That's What I Call Music! 10 is the tenth volume of the Now That's What I Call Music! series in the United States. It was released on July 23, 2002, and debuted at number two on the Billboard 200 albums chart. It has been certified Platinum by the RIAA.

What's New!
The album was released with a limited edition promotional disc with 10 songs from mostly new and upcoming artists, titled What's New!

Reception 

Stephen Thomas Erlewine of AllMusic says: "Aside from having lesser-known hits such as 'First Date' and 'A New Day Has Come,' NOW 10 is recommended because it captures the particular sound and spirit of the time it covers." He adds, "The album captures that feeling of the music industry's slump in terms of sales and quality, and unlike radio in 2002, there are enough hits and good songs during this hour to make it worth listening to, overall."

Kimberly Reyes of Entertainment Weekly states that the album has a strange but diverse variety of songs, and Billboard even acknowledges that the album "goes a bit heavier on up-and-coming artists then past "NOW" sets."

Track listing

Charts

Weekly charts

Year-end charts

Certifications

References 

2002 compilation albums
 010
Virgin Records compilation albums